Lasioglossum villosulum is a Palearctic species of sweat bee.

References

External links
Images representing  Lasioglossum villosulum

Hymenoptera of Europe
villosulum
Insects described in 1802